We Do What We Want is the fifth studio album by the American rock band Emery. The album was released on March 29, 2011 through Tooth & Nail Records and Solid State Records. Shortly after announcing the release of We Do What We Want, founding bassist Devin Shelton announced he would be taking an indefinite hiatus from Emery.

Writing
Emery was in the process of working on more stripped-down acoustic album when guitarist/vocalist Devin Shelton decided to take an indefinite leave of absence from the group. After his departure, the remaining four members made the conscious decision to write a heavier and more hardcore album than they had done in the past. Commenting on the band's evolved sound, bassist/vocalist Toby Morrell said, "I don't think we ever thought we'd get as heavy as we are now, but I'm glad we have." Though Shelton was not an active member of Emery during the writing process for We Do What We Want, he wrote the final track on the standard edition titled "Fix Me," and the song "Crumbling" from the deluxe edition.

Lyrics
Regarding the album's lyrical themes, vocalist Toby Morrell stated:

Release and promotion
In the month of March 2011, an MP3 for the song "Scissors" was divided into seven sections. For seven consecutive days, one new piece of the song was revealed through a different online media outlet. The band would give a clue as to where the next clip would be released on their Facebook page, and fans were encouraged to collect all of the parts and put the song back together. Also prior to the release of We Do What We Want, Emery previewed "The Cheval Glass," "I Never Got to See the West Coast" and "The Curse of Perfect Days."

We Do What We Want was released on March 29, 2011 through Tooth & Nail Records, and it is also Emery's first album co-released by Tooth & Nail's heavy metal/hardcore punk subdivision Solid State Records. Vocalist Toby Morell has said that he was "proud" of the signing to Solid State, and also described it as "just kind of a good feeling to be wanted by another part of your company and be able to join all the awesome bands."

Track listing
All songs composed by Emery, except "Fix Me" composed by Devin Shelton.

Personnel
Emery
 Toby Morell – lead vocals, bass, screamed vocals
 Matt Carter – guitar, backing vocals
 Josh Head – screamed vocals, keyboards, synthesizers, programming
 Dave Powell – drums, percussion

Production
Produced and engineered by Matt Carter at Compound Recording
Additional production and vocals by Aaron Sprinkle
Assisted by Matt Clear, Doug Finley and Jake Thomson
Tracks 1-6 mixed by Jason Suecof
Tracks 7, 8 and 10 mixed by Craig Alvin
Track 9 mixed by Matt Carter
Additional mixing by Rick Senechal
Mastered by Troy Glessner at Spectre South
Executive producer: Brandon Ebel
Additional arranging by Zack Ordway, Ryan Macoubrie and Kyle Phillips

References

External links
 Track By Track Breakdown by Toby Morrell

Emery (band) albums
2011 albums
Tooth & Nail Records albums